A ternary complex is a protein complex containing three different molecules that are bound together. In structural biology, ternary complex can also be used to describe a crystal containing a protein with two small molecules bound, for example cofactor and substrate; or a complex formed between two proteins and a single substrate. In Immunology, ternary complex can refer to the MHC–peptide–T-cell-receptor complex formed when T cells recognize epitopes of an antigen.
Some other example can be taken like ternary complex while eukaryotic translation, in which ternary complex is composed of eIF-3 & eIF-2 + Ribosome 40s subunit+ tRNAi.
A ternary complex can be a complex formed between two substrate molecules and an enzyme. This is seen in multi-substrate enzyme-catalyzed reactions where two substrates and two products can be formed. The ternary complex is an intermediate between the product formation in this type of enzyme-catalyzed reactions. An example for a ternary complex is seen in random-order mechanism or a compulsory-order mechanism of enzyme catalysis for multi substrates. 

The term ternary complex can also refer to a polymer formed by electrostatic interactions.

References

Protein complexes

Trevor Palmer (Enzymes, 2nd edition)